Green Mountain is a peak in the Glacier Peak Wilderness above the Suiattle River in Snohomish County, Washington. It is notable for being the site of the Green Mountain Lookout, which was preserved by an Act of Congress in 2014.

Climate
Green Mountain is located in the marine west coast climate zone of western North America. Most weather fronts originate in the Pacific Ocean, and travel northeast toward the Cascade Mountains. As fronts approach the North Cascades, they are forced upward by the peaks of the Cascade Range (orographic lift), causing them to drop their moisture in the form of rain or snowfall onto the Cascades. As a result, the west side of the North Cascades experiences high precipitation, especially during the winter months in the form of snowfall. During winter months, weather is usually cloudy, but, due to high pressure systems over the Pacific Ocean that intensify during summer months, there is often little or no cloud cover during the summer. Because of maritime influence, snow tends to be wet and heavy, resulting in high avalanche danger.

References

External links
Washington Trails Association
Green Mountain Lookout at U.S. Forest Service

Mountains of Washington (state)
Mountains of Snohomish County, Washington